Woodstock Day School is an independent co-educational school serving students from nursery to high school in Saugerties, New York, United States. It is about 3 miles east to the town of Woodstock.

References

External links
School website

Educational institutions established in 1973
Private elementary schools in New York (state)
Private high schools in New York (state)
Saugerties, New York
Schools in Ulster County, New York
Private middle schools in New York (state)